Jin Dongxiang (born 30 May 1957) is a Chinese sport shooter who competed in the 1984 Summer Olympics.

References

1957 births
Living people
Chinese female sport shooters
ISSF rifle shooters
Olympic shooters of China
Shooters at the 1984 Summer Olympics
Shooters at the 1978 Asian Games
Shooters at the 1982 Asian Games
Shooters at the 1986 Asian Games
Asian Games medalists in shooting
Asian Games gold medalists for China
Asian Games bronze medalists for China
Medalists at the 1978 Asian Games
Medalists at the 1982 Asian Games
Medalists at the 1986 Asian Games